Mariner 6 and Mariner 7 (Mariner Mars 69A and Mariner Mars 69B) were two unmanned NASA robotic spacecraft that completed the first dual mission to Mars in 1969 as part of NASA's wider Mariner program. Mariner 6 was launched from Launch Complex 36B at Cape Canaveral Air Force Station and Mariner 7 from Launch Complex 36A. The two craft flew over the equator and south polar regions, analyzing the atmosphere and the surface with remote sensors, and recording and relaying hundreds of pictures. The mission's goals were to study the surface and atmosphere of Mars during close flybys, in order to establish the basis for future investigations, particularly those relevant to the search for extraterrestrial life, and to demonstrate and develop technologies required for future Mars missions. Mariner 6 also had the objective of providing experience and data which would be useful in programming the Mariner 7 encounter five days later.

Launch

Three Mariner probes were constructed for the mission, with two intended to fly and one as a spare in the event of a mission failure. The spacecraft was shipped to Cape Canaveral with their Atlas-Centaur boosters in December 1968 – January 1969 to begin pre-launch checkouts and testing. On February 14, Mariner 6 was undergoing a simulated countdown on LC-36A, electrical power running, but no propellant loaded in the booster. During the test run, an electrical relay in the Atlas malfunctioned and opened two valves in the pneumatic system which allowed helium pressure gas to escape from the booster's balloon skin. The Atlas began to crumple over, however two pad technicians quickly activated a manual override switch to close the valves and pump helium back in. Although Mariner 6 and its Centaur stage had been saved, the Atlas had sustained structural damage and could not be reused, so they were removed from the booster and placed atop Mariner 7's launch vehicle on the adjacent LC-36B, while a different Atlas was used for Mariner 7. NASA awarded the quick-thinking technicians, Bill McClure and Charles (Jack) Beverlin, an Exceptional Medal of Bravery for their courage in risking being crushed underneath the  rocket. In 2014, an escarpment on Mars which NASA'S Opportunity rover had recently visited was named the McClure-Beverlin Ridge in honor of the pair, who had since died.

Mariner 6 lifted off from LC-36B at Cape Canaveral on February 25, 1969, using the Atlas-Centaur AC-20 rocket, while Mariner 7 lifted off from LC-36A on March 27, using the Atlas-Centaur AC-19 rocket. The boost phase for both spacecraft went according to plan and no serious anomalies occurred with either launch vehicle. A minor LOX leak froze some telemetry probes in AC-20 which registered as a drop in sustainer engine fuel pressure; however, the engine performed normally through powered flight. In addition,  occurred a few seconds early due to a faulty cutoff switch, resulting in longer than intended burn time of the sustainer engine, but this had no serious effect on vehicle performance or the flight path. AC-20 was launched at a 108-degree azimuth.

The Centaur stage on both flights was set up to perform a retrorocket maneuver after capsule separation. This served two purposes, firstly to prevent venting propellant from the spent Centaur from contacting the probe, secondly to put the vehicle on a trajectory that would send it into solar orbit and not impact the Martian surface, potentially contaminating the planet with Earth microbes.

Spaceflight
On July 29, 1969, less than a week before closest approach, Jet Propulsion Laboratory (JPL) lost contact with Mariner 7. The center regained the signal via the backup low-gain antenna and regained use of the high gain antenna again shortly after Mariner 6's close encounter. Leaking gases from a battery (which later failed) were thought to have caused the anomaly. Based on the observations that Mariner 6 made, Mariner 7 was reprogrammed in flight to take further observations of areas of interest and actually returned more pictures than Mariner 6, despite the battery's failure.

This was less than half of the distance used by Mariner 4 on the previous US Mars flyby mission.

Both spacecraft are now defunct and in heliocentric orbits.

Science data and findings

By chance, both spacecraft flew over cratered regions and missed both the giant northern volcanoes and the equatorial grand canyon discovered later. Their approach pictures did, however, photograph about 20 percent of the planet's surface, showing the dark features long seen from Earth – in the past, these features had been mistaken for canals by some ground-based astronomers. When Mariner 7 flew over the martian south pole on August 4, 1969, it sent back pictures of ice-filled craters and outlines of the south polar cap. Despite the communication defect suffered by Mariner 7 earlier, these pictures were of better quality than what had been sent by its twin, Mariner 6, a few days earlier when it flew past the martian equator. In total, 201 photos were taken and transmitted back to Earth, adding more detail than the earlier mission, Mariner 4. Both crafts also studied the atmosphere of Mars.

Coming a week after Apollo 11, Mariner 6 and 7's flyby of Mars received less than the normal amount of media coverage for a mission of this significance.

The ultraviolet spectrometer onboard Mariners 6 and 7 was constructed by University of Colorado's Laboratory for Atmospheric and Space Physics (LASP).

The engineering model of Mariners 6 and 7 still exists, and is owned by the Jet Propulsion Laboratory (JPL). It is on loan to LASP, and is on display in the lab's lobby.

Mariner 6 and 7 infrared radiometer observations helped to trigger a scientific revolution in Mars knowledge. The Mariner 6 and 7 infrared radiometer results showed that the atmosphere of Mars is composed mostly of carbon dioxide (CO2), and they were also able to detect trace amounts of water on the surface of Mars.

Spacecraft and subsystems 
A conical superstructure mounted on top of the frame held the high-gain  diameter parabolic antenna and four solar panels, each measuring  x , were affixed to the top corners of the frame. Underneath the octagonal frame was a two-axis scan platform which held scientific instruments.

The spacecraft was attitude stabilized in three axes, referenced to the sun and the star Canopus. It utilized 3 gyros, 2 sets of 6 nitrogen jets, which were mounted on the ends of the solar panels, a Canopus tracker, and two primary and four secondary sun sensors. Propulsion was provided by a 223-newton rocket motor, mounted within the frame, which used the mono-propellant hydrazine. The nozzle, with 4-jet vane vector control, protruded from one wall of the octagonal structure. These could provide 800 watts of power near Earth, and 449 watts while at Mars. The maximum power requirement was 380 watts, once Mars was reached. A 1200 watt-hour, rechargeable, silver-zinc battery was used to provide backup power. Thermal control was achieved through the use of adjustable louvers on the sides of the main compartment.

Three telemetry channels were available for telecommunications. Channel A carried engineering data at 8⅓ or 33⅓ bit/s, channel B carried scientific data at 66⅔ or 270 bit/s and channel C carried science data at 16,200 bit/s. Communications were accomplished through the high- and low-gain antennas, via dual S-band traveling wave tube amplifiers, operating at 10 or 20 watts, for transmission. The design also included a single receiver. An analog tape recorder, with a capacity of 195 million bits, could store television images for subsequent transmission. Other science data was stored on a digital recorder. The command system, consisting of a central computer and sequencer (CC&S), was designed to actuate specific events at precise times. The CC&S was programmed with both a standard mission and a conservative backup mission before launch, but could be commanded and reprogrammed in flight. It could perform 53 direct commands, 5 control commands, and 4 quantitative commands.

Instrumentation:

 IR Spectrometer
 Two-Channel IR Radiometer Mars Surface Temperature
 UV Spectrometer
 S-Band Occultation
 Thermal Control Flux Monitor (Conical Radiometer)
 Mars TV Camera
 Celestial Mechanics
 General Relativity

See also 

 List of missions to Mars
 Space exploration
 Unmanned space missions
Heat Flow and Physical Properties Package (Included an infrared radiometer for the martian surface)

References

External links 
 Mariner Mars 1969 Launches - Press Kit
 Tracking and data system support for the Mariner Mars 1969 mission. Volume 1 - Planning phase through midcourse maneuver
 Tracking and data system support for the Mariner Mars 1969 mission. Volume 2: Midcourse maneuver through end of nominal mission
 Tracking and data system support for the Mariner Mars 1969 mission. Volume 3: Extended operations mission
 The Mariner 6 and 7 flight paths and their determination from tracking data
 Two over Mars - Mariner 6 and Mariner 7, February - August 1969
 Mariner 6 Mission Profile by NASA's Solar System Exploration
 Mariner 7 Mission Profile by NASA's Solar System Exploration
 Mariner 6 and 7 Data Set Information (highly technical)
 Mariner 6 and 7 Data Viewer Page (includes many images)
 Page with reprocessed Mariner 7 images
 Mariner 6 and 7 images

Mariner program
Missions to Mars
Spacecraft launched in 1969
Derelict satellites in heliocentric orbit
Derelict space probes
Spacecraft launched by Atlas-Centaur rockets

de:Mariner#Mariner 6 und 7